Ordnance Factory Board (OFB), consisting of the Indian Ordnance Factories, now known as Directorate of Ordnance (Coordination & Services) was an organisation, under the Department of Defence Production (DDP) of Ministry of Defence (MoD), Government of India. The 41 Indian Ordnance Factories have been converted into 7 Defence Public Sector Undertakings (DPSUs).

OFB was the 37th-largest defence equipment manufacturer in the world, 2nd-largest in Asia, and the largest in India. OFB was the world's largest government-operated production organisation, and the oldest organisation in India. It had a total workforce of about 80,000. It was often called the "Fourth Arm of Defence", and the "Force Behind the Armed Forces" of India.

It was engaged in research, development, production, testing, marketing and logistics of a product range in the areas of air, land and sea systems. OFB consisted of forty-one ordnance factories, nine training institutes, three regional marketing centres and four regional controllerates of safety, which are spread all across the country. Every year, 18 March is celebrated as the Ordnance Factory Day in India.

History

Origins 
The Indian Ordnance Factories predate all the other organisations like the Indian Army and the Indian Railways by over a century. The first Indian ordnance factory can trace its origins back to the year 1712 when the Dutch Ostend Company established a Gun Powder Factory in Ichhapur. In 1787, another gunpowder factory was established at Ichapore; it began production in 1791, and the site was later used as a rifle factory, beginning in 1904. In 1801, Gun Carriage Agency (now known as Gun & Shell Factory, Cossipore) was established at Cossipore, Calcutta, and production began on 18 March 1802. This is the oldest ordnance factory in India still in existence.

Contributions 
The Indian Ordnance Factories have not only supported India through the wars, but also played an important role in building India, with the advancement of technology, and have ushered the Industrial Revolution in India, starting with the first modern steel, aluminium, copper plants of India, first modern electric textile mill of India, first chemical industries of India, established the first engineering colleges of India, as its training schools, sparked India's first war of independence in 1857 with its rifles and bullets, and also played key role in the founding of research and industrial organisations like ISRO, DRDO, BDL, BEL, BEML, SAIL, etc.

Timeline 
 1712 – Establishment of the Dutch Ostend Company's Gun Powder Factory at Ichhapur.
 1775 – Establishment of the Board of Ordnance at Fort William, Kolkata.
 1787 – Establishment of the Gun Powder Factory at Ishapore.
 1791 – Production of Gun Powder begins at Ishapore.
 1801 – Establishment of Gun Carriage Agency at Cossipore, Kolkata.
 1802 – Production begins at Cossipore on 18 March.
 1935 – Indian Ordnance Service was introduced to administer the whole Defence Production Industry of India.
 1954 – Indian Ordnance Service (IOS) renamed to Indian Ordnance Factories Service (IOFS).
 1979 – Ordnance Factory Board is established on 2 April.

Restructuring OFB into seven PSUs 
On 17 June 2021, the Defence Ministry announced its plans to split the existing five operating divisions of OFB, in addition to parachutes and opto-electronics, into seven PSUs, wholly owned by the government. It was mentioned that all existing factories and employees will become a part of these seven PSUs. From 1 October 2021, OFB has been dissolved and all the management, control, operations and maintenance has been transferred to 7 newly formed Defence PSUs, namely:

Advanced Weapons and Equipment India Limited (AWE)
Armoured Vehicles Nigam Limited (AVANI)
Gliders India Limited (GIL)
India Optel Limited (IOL)
Munitions India Limited (MIL)
Troop Comforts Limited (TCL)
Yantra India Limited (YIL)

The new companies were launched and dedicated to the nation on 15 October 2021.

Infrastructure and leadership of OFB

Headquarters 
 Ordnance Factory Board, Kolkata 
 Armoured Vehicles Headquarters, Chennai 
 Ordnance Equipment Factories Headquarters, Kanpur 
 Ordnance Factory Board, New Delhi Office 
 Ordnance Factory Cell, Mumbai 
 Ordnance Factories Recruitment Centre, Nagpur

Apex Board 
The Apex Board was headed by the Director General of Ordnance Factories (DGOF), who acts as the Chairman of the board (ex officio Secretary to Government of India) and consisted of nine other members, who each held the rank of Additional DGOF. Ordnance factories were divided into five operating divisions, depending upon the type of the main products/technologies employed. These were:
 Ammunition and Explosives 
 Weapons, Vehicles & Equipment
 Materials and Components
 Armoured Vehicles
 Ordnance Equipment Group of Factories

Each of the above group of factories was headed by a Member/Additional DGOF who was in the rank of Special Secretary to Government of India. The four remaining members were responsible for staff functions, viz personnel, finance, planning and material management, and technical services, and they operated from Kolkata.

Ordnance factories 

Each ordnance factory was headed by a General Manager who is in the rank of Additional Secretary to the Government of India.

Training institutes, regional centres and controllerates 
 National Academy of Defence Production
National Academy of Defence Production provides training to the IOFS officers in areas of technology, management, public administration as induction and re-orientation courses.

There were Ordnance Factories Institutes of Learning (OFILs) in Ambajhari, Ambernath, Avadi, Dehradun, Ishapore, Khamaria, Kanpur and Medak. Each OFIL was headed by a principal director, and NADP by a senior principal director. NADP provided training to Group A officers, whilst the other eight institutes imparted training to Group B and Group C employees of the ordnance factories.

OFB had Regional marketing centres and Regional controllerates of safety as well.

Joint Ventures 
In 2017, the Department of Defence Production under the Ministry of Defence opened itself to for Joint Ventures with OFB and DRDO was also tasked with identifying their products and patents, with the scope of commercial production

 Indo-Russia Rifles Private Limited (IRRPL), Amethi

A joint venture between Ordnance Factory Board (50.5%), Kalashnikov Concern (42%) and Rosonboronexport (7.5%) established to produce AK-203 (7.62×39mm) assault rifles intended for Indian Security Forces.

Indian Ordnance Factories Service (IOFS) 

The Indian Ordnance Factories Service (IOFS) is a civil service of the Government of India. IOFS officers are Gazetted (Group A) defence-civilian officers under the Ministry of Defence.

IOFS is a multi-disciplinary composite cadre consisting of technical – engineers (civil, electrical, mechanical, electronics), technologists (aerospace, automotive, marine, industrial/product design, computer, nuclear, optical, chemical, metallurgical, textile, leather) and non-technical/administrative (science, law, commerce, management and arts graduates). Technical posts account for about 87% of the total cadre. The doctors (surgeons and physicians) serving in OFB belong to a separate service known as the Indian Ordnance Factories Health Service (IOFHS). IOFHS officers are responsible for the maintenance of health of the employees, and the hospitals of OFB. They report directly to the IOFS officers. IOFS and IOFHS are the only two civil services under the Department of Defence Production.

Products 
The type of ordnance material produced is very diverse, including various small arms to missiles, rockets, bombs, grenades, military vehicles, armoured vehicles, chemicals, optical devices, parachutes, mortars, artillery pieces plus all associated ammunition, propellants, explosives and fuses.

Civilian products 
Civilians are required to hold an Arms License (issued only for non-prohibited bore category weapons) in order to buy firearms in India. The following products of the Indian Ordnance Factories Board are available for civilians:

Arms 
 IOF .22 revolver
 IOF .32 revolver (7.65 mm X 23)
 IOF .32 revolver Nirbheek
 IOF .32 pistol Ashani
 IOF .22 sporting rifle
 IOF .315 sporting rifle
 IOF .30-06 sporting rifle

Ammunition 
 Cartridge Rimfire .22" Ball
 Cartridge SA .32" Revolver
 Cartridge SA .315" and .30-06 Ball
 Cartridge SA 12 Bore 70mm
 Cartridge SA 12 Bore 65 mm Special

Military Products 
These products are exclusively manufactured for use by the armed forces and are not sold to civilians.

Customers

Armed Forces 
The prime customers of Indian Ordnance Factories were the Indian Armed Forces viz. Indian Army, Indian Navy and the Indian Air Force. Apart from supplying armaments to the Armed Forces, Ordnance Factories also meet the requirements of other customers viz. the Central Armed Police Forces, State Armed Police Forces, Paramilitary Forces of India and the Special Forces of India in respect of arms, ammunition, clothing, bullet proof vehicles, mine protected vehicles etc.

Civil trade 
Customers are in the civil sector, central/state government organisations and departments such as Indian Railways, Indian Space Research Organisation, Defence Research and Development Organisation, Liquid Propulsion Systems Centre, Nuclear Fuel Complex, Aeronautical Development Agency, Department of Atomic Energy, Department of Telecommunications, and State Electricity Boards. Public Sector Undertakings in India (PSUs) such as HMT Limited, Hindustan Aeronautics Limited, Bharat Heavy Electricals Limited, Bharat Dynamics Limited, private companies and individuals etc. who purchased industrial chemicals, explosives, arms, ammunition, brass ingots, aluminium alloy products for aircraft, steel castings and forgings, vehicles, clothing and leather goods, cables and opto-electronic instruments.

Exports 
Arms and ammunition, weapon spares, chemicals and explosives, parachutes, leather and clothing items were exported to more than 30 countries worldwide.
 Asia: Thailand, Malaysia, Indonesia, Sri Lanka, Bangladesh, Myanmar, Vietnam, Nepal, Singapore
 Europe: Germany, Belgium, Cyprus, Greece, Turkey, Russia, Sweden, France, Switzerland, United Kingdom
 Middle East: Oman, Egypt, Israel, Saudi Arabia, UAE
 Africa: Kenya, Botswana, Nigeria
 North and South America: United States, Canada, Brazil, Chile, Suriname

Notable employees 
 Narinder Singh Kapany – Former IOFS officer. Invented fibre optics that revolutionised laparoscopic and endoscopic surgery, telecommunications, power transmission, etc. Named as one of the seven "Unsung Heroes of the 20th century" by Fortune magazine for his Nobel Prize-deserving invention.  Known as the "Father of Fibre Optics" and "The Man who Bent Light".  Former Professor at Stanford, Universities of California at Berkeley, Santa Barbara and Santa Cruz. Had more than 150 patents to his credit. Conferred upon with Padma Vibhushan, the second-highest honour in India, Pravasi Bharatiya Samman, Fellowship of the Royal Academy of Engineering (FREng). He was also offered the post of Scientific Adviser to the Defence Minister of India, by the first Prime Minister of India, Jawaharlal Nehru.
 Nalini Ranjan Mohanty - Former IOFS officer. Secured All India 2nd Rank in the Engineering Services Examination of 1965, served as the Chairman & Managing Director of Hindustan Aeronautics Limited, Director of Kudremukh Iron Ore Company, Mahanadi Coalfields, National Aluminium Company (NALCO), Bharat Earth Movers (BEML). Awarded Padma Shri in 2004 by the Government of India for his role in the development of LCA – Tejas.
Brijmohan Lall Munjal - Founder of Hero MotoCorp, the world's largest two-wheeler manufacturer, and Hero Cycles, world's largest cycle manufacturer. Awarded Padma Bhushan.
 H. P. S. Ahluwalia – IOFS. First Indian to climb Mount Everest.  Author, mountaineer, social worker. Founder & Chairman of Indian Spinal Injuries Centre. Conferred on with the Arjuna Award, Padma Shri and Padma Bhushan by the Government of India, Fellowship of Royal Geographical Society (FRGS). Also served as a Commissioned officer in the Indian Army and Member of Planning Commission (India).
 Santu Shahaney - IOFS. Served as the Director General Ordnance Factories (DGOF). He was awarded Padma Shri in 1962, and Padma Bhushan in 1965, by the Government of India, in the Civil Service category, for his contributions during the Indo-China War of 1962 and the Indo-Pakistani War of 1965, respectively.
 R. M. Muzumdar - IOFS. Second Indian Director General of the Indian Ordnance Factories.  He was awarded the Padma Bhushan by the Government of India, in 1973, in the Civil service category, for his contributions during the Indo-Pakistani War of 1971
 Waman Dattatreya Patwardhan - IOFS officer. Developed the solid propellant for India's first space rocket launched from Thumba, and the detonation system of India's first nuclear bomb used in Operation Smiling Buddha. Served at the Ammunition Factory Khadki, and as the first Director of High Energy Materials Research Laboratory (HEMRL) and the Armaments Research and Development Establishment (ARDE) of the Defence Research and Development Organisation (DRDO). Awarded Padma Shri in 1974.
 H. G. S. Murthy - IOFS. Known as one of the "Seven Pioneers of the Indian Space Programme". He served at the Machine Tool Prototype Factory (MTPF), Ambernath, and as the first Director of the Thumba Equatorial Rocket Launching Station (TERLS), and the Space Science & Technology Centre, now known as the Vikram Sarabhai Space Centre, of the Indian Space Research Organisation (ISRO). Awarded Padma Shri in 1969.
K. C. Banerjee - IOFS. Received Padma Shri in 1967, for his contributions during the Indo-Pakistani War of 1965, as the General Manager of Rifle Factory Ishapore,  that developed and manufactured the 7.62 Self-Loading Automatic Rifle, that played decisive role in India's victory in the Indo-Pakistani War of 1965.
O. P. Bahl, an IOFS officer. Received Padma Shri in 1972, in the civil-service category, as the General Manager of Ammunition Factory Khadki, which developed and manufactured the anti-submarine rockets used in sinking the submarine PNS Ghazi during the Indo-Pakistani War of 1971.

References 

Military of India
Manufacturing companies based in Kolkata
Firearm manufacturers of India
Government-owned companies of India
Military research installations of India
Defence companies of India
Automotive companies of India
Chemical companies of India
Electronics companies of India
Steel companies of India
Textile companies of India
Defence agencies of India
Ministry of Defence (India)